Alicia Pietri Montemayor (14 October 1923 – 9 February 2011) was a public figure in Venezuela who twice served as First Lady of Venezuela (1969–1974 and 1994–1999) as the wife of Venezuelan president Rafael Caldera. She was the founder of the Children's Museum of Caracas. She served as president of the Children’s Foundation in Venezuela, and was also involved in other organizations dedicated to childcare.

Personal life

Alicia Pietri Montemayor was born on October 14, 1923. 
She married Rafael Caldera on 6 August 1941. The couple had six children: Mireya, Rafael Tomás, Juan José, Alicia Helena, Cecilia and Andrés. Juan José Caldera (born 1948) became a politician. 
Her husband died on December 24, 2009, after struggling for several years with Parkinson’s Disease. 
She died in Caracas, Venezuela on February 9, 2011 at the age 87, of natural causes.

See also  

List of first ladies of Venezuela
Children's Museum of Caracas

References

External links

1923 births
2011 deaths
First Ladies of Venezuela
Museum founders
Recipients of the Order of Isabella the Catholic
Dames Grand Cross of the Order of Isabella the Catholic
Rafael Caldera